Sydnones are mesoionic heterocyclic chemical compounds possessing a 1,2,3-oxadiazole core with a keto group in the 5 position. Like other mesoionic compounds they are di-polar, possessing both positive and negative charges which are delocalized across the ring. Recent computational studies have indicated that sydnones and other similar mesoionic compounds are nonaromatic, "though well-stabilized in two separate regions by electron and charge delocalization." Sydnones are heterocyclic compounds named after the city of Sydney, Australia.

A sydnone imine in which the keto group of sydnone (=O) has been replaced with an imino (=NH) group can be found as a substructure in the stimulant drugs feprosidnine and mesocarb.

Discovery 
Sydnone was first prepared in 1935 by Earl & Mackney by cyclodehydration of N-Nitroso-N-phenylglycine with acetic anhydride. Later work showed that this could be applied fairly generally to the nitrosamines of N-substituted amino acids.

Chemical structure

Examples
Cefanone (Cephanone)
Ipramidil
3-Thiomorpholino-sydnonimine 
The reaction between methyl 3-benzyl-sydnone-4-acetate and diphenylacetylene is described in Ex1 of  gives an analog of Bufezolac.
Synthesis and Biological Evaluation of Coumarinyl Sydnone Derivatives.

See also 
 Chemical compounds with unusual names
 Montréalone
 Münchnone
 Sydnone imine

References

 
 
 88, 178 (1961); 

,;

External links 
 IUPAC Goldbook entry
 Dictionary of Organic Compounds
Oxadiazoles
Simple aromatic rings
Lactones